The Nissan R89C was a Group C sports prototype developed by Nissan.

Development
Replacing the original March built series of prototypes that Nissan had used, the R89C was part of Nissan's increased involvement in the project.  Developed in conjunction with the Lola firm, the R89C featured a Kevlar and carbon-fibre based monocoque chassis (named T89/10 by Lola). Nissan's new twin-turbo VRH35 3.5L V8 DOHC engine was mounted in a stressed installation for better chassis rigidity and produced up to 950bhp.

Racing history
In the 1989 World Sportscar Championship season, Nissan struggled to solve not only reliability problems, but also to find pace from the new chassis and engine. As a result, the R89C was only able to score points in three races. Even though, it finished the season fifth in the team's championship.  In the All Japan Sports Prototype Championship, the R89C suffered the same fate, unable to compete with its developed Porsche and Toyota opponents, leaving Nissan to finish the season third in the championship.  Meanwhile, at the 24 Hours of Le Mans, three R89Cs were entered into the race.  However, all three failed to finish the race due to mechanical problems.

For 1990, the R89C was campaigned by Nissan for the first race of the World Sportscar Championship until it was replaced by both the R90CK and R90CP.  2 R89Cs would be passed on to privateer teams, with Courage Compétition managing to finish 22nd in the 1990 24 Hours of Le Mans with an ex-factory R89C (chassis #01). Chassis #03 was modified by Team Le Mans to become known as R90V.  It ran JSPC with a best result of sixth before being retired. It also ran at Le Mans in 1990 retiring at about 7.00 AM.

R89C chassis #02 was rebuilt as an R90CP for use by Nismo at Le Mans and in the All-Japan Sports-Prototype Championship.

References 

Nissan racing cars
Lola racing cars
Group C cars
24 Hours of Le Mans race cars